Constant Chaos is the debut studio album by Green Velvet. It was released on Music Man Records in 1999.

Critical reception

John Bush of AllMusic wrote, "Though none of the previous Green Velvet club favorites are reprised for his album, Cajmere has created a raft of future classics, all along the same lines." Peter Margasak of Chicago Reader commented that "his austere mix of robotic rhythms, analog synth squelches, and occasionally hallucinatory lyrics sounds like nothing else out there." Richard Brophy of Hot Press described the album as "a minefield of personal traumas and reflections on the woes of our world".

Track listing

Personnel
Credits adapted from the CD edition's liner notes.

 Green Velvet – vocals, instruments, production, engineering
 The Misfits – additional vocals (2)
 Michael Voltattorni – photography
 Phreddy Lee – photography

References

External links
 

1999 debut albums
Green Velvet albums